Lampman is a small town of around 735 people located in the south-east part of the province of Saskatchewan, Canada, roughly 30 miles north-east of Estevan. It is named after the Canadian poet, Archibald Lampman.

To the north-west of Lampman, is Lake Roy, which is a shallow lake that often floods into town. Lampman's water supply is obtained from two deep wells that go through a water treatment system.

History
The village of Lampman was founded on September 13, 1910. It gained the status of town on June 1, 1963. As mentioned, it was named for Canadian poet Archibald Lampman, one of the Confederation Poets. It is also part of "Poet's Corner" in south-east Saskatchewan. Several communities and stops along the CN Railway in this part of the province were named after famous British and Canadian poets. Some of the other places include, Carlyle (Thomas Carlyle), Browning (Robert Browning), Service (Robert W. Service), Cowper (William Cowper), and Wordsworth (William Wordsworth).

Demographics 

Education
Lampman has one school that covers Kindergarten through grade 12, with an enrollment of 210 students.

Sports and recreation
Lampman has a community complex that includes an Outdoor Swimming Pool, hockey arena, curling rink with four sheets of ice, and five baseball diamonds. The town also has a racetrack, golf course, campground, parks, and a walking path. The Lampman A's baseball team was inducted into the Saskatchewan Baseball Hall of Fame on August 18, 2012.

Services and transportation
Lampman has volunteer ambulance service, volunteer fire department, and emergency rescue.

The town is serviced by a freight railway line, grain elevator, Lampman Airport (CJQ2), and two highways, Highway 361 and Highway 605.

See also 

List of communities in Saskatchewan
List of towns in Saskatchewan

References

Towns in Saskatchewan
Division No. 1, Saskatchewan